Desislava Vasileva Bozhilova (born 16 October 1992) a Bulgarian international snooker referee on the World Snooker Tour. Since passing the examination to become an international snooker referee, she has officiated ranking event finals and served as a referee at the World Snooker Championship. She refereed her first Triple Crown final at the 2022 Masters. Her second Triple Crown final as a referee came at the 2022 UK Championship.

Early life and education

Bozhilova was born and grew up in Sliven, Bulgaria,  a city that does not have many people playing snooker. At the age of 13, Bozhilova began playing pool before becoming interested in snooker by watching it on television. She relocated to the Bulgarian capital of Sofia in 2012. Bozhilova holds a Master's degree in Landscape Architecture following her graduation from the University of Forestry, Sofia in 2016, and between snooker competitions produces 3D visualisations of homes.

Career
She learnt of the existence of the Bulgarian Snooker Referees Association in 2011 helping people to become snooker referees and she made the decision to get involved in it. Bozhilova passed the examination to become an international snooker referee the following year. The first international snooker tournament Bozhilova refereed in was the 2012 Bulgarian Open on the Players Tour Championship. She officiated her first ranking final, which was the 2016 Riga Masters. 

That same year, Bozhilova made her refereeing debut in a Triple Crown event when she officiated a match at the 2016 UK Championship. She has refereed other ranking finals such as in the English Open, German Masters and the Players Championship. Bozhilova made her debut at the main stages of the World Snooker Championship at the 2019 tournament. She again was selected to referee at the World Championship for the following year's competition. Her first Triple Crown final was the final of the 2022 Masters.

See also
 List of snooker referees

References

1992 births
Living people
People from Sliven
20th-century Bulgarian women
21st-century Bulgarian women
Snooker referees and officials
Women referees and umpires